This is a list of cases reported in volume 307 of United States Reports, decided by the Supreme Court of the United States in 1939.

Justices of the Supreme Court at the time of volume 307 U.S. 

The Supreme Court is established by Article III, Section 1 of the Constitution of the United States, which says: "The judicial Power of the United States, shall be vested in one supreme Court . . .". The size of the Court is not specified; the Constitution leaves it to Congress to set the number of justices. Under the Judiciary Act of 1789 Congress originally fixed the number of justices at six (one chief justice and five associate justices). Since 1789 Congress has varied the size of the Court from six to seven, nine, ten, and back to nine justices (always including one chief justice).

When the cases in volume 307 were decided the Court comprised the following members:

Notable Cases in 307 U.S.

United States v. Miller 
United States v. Miller, 307 U.S. 174 (1939), is a significant Supreme Court decision involving a Second Amendment to the United States Constitution challenge to the National Firearms Act of 1934 (NFA). The case is often cited in the ongoing American gun politics debate, as both sides claim that it supports their position.

Lane v. Wilson 
In Lane v. Wilson, 307 U.S. 268 (1939), the Supreme Court ruled that a 12-day, one-time voter registration window was discriminatory for black citizens and repugnant to the Fifteenth Amendment.

Perkins, Secretary of Labor v. Elg 
Perkins, Secretary of Labor v. Elg, 307 U.S. 325 (1939), is a decision by the Supreme Court that a child born in the United States to naturalized parents is a natural-born citizen, and that the child's U.S. citizenship is not lost if the child is taken to and raised in the country of the parents' origin, provided that upon attaining the age of majority, the young person elects to retain U.S. citizenship "and to return to the United States to assume its duties."

Coleman v. Miller, Secretary of the Senate of Kansas 
Coleman v. Miller, Secretary of the Senate of Kansas, 307 U.S. 433 (1939), is a landmark decision of the Supreme Court, which clarified that if the Congress of the United States—when proposing for ratification an amendment to the United States Constitution, pursuant to Article V —chooses not to set a deadline by which the state legislatures of three-fourths of the states or, if prescribed by Congress state ratifying conventions in three-fourths of the states, must act upon the proposed amendment, then the proposed amendment remains pending business before the state legislatures (or ratifying conventions). The case centered on the Child Labor Amendment, which was proposed for ratification by Congress in 1924. In light of the precedent established by this ruling, three proposed constitutional amendments, in addition to the Child Labor Amendment, are considered still to be pending before the state legislatures, since Congress did not specify a ratification deadline: the Congressional Apportionment Amendment since 1789; the Titles of Nobility Amendment since 1810; and the Corwin Amendment since 1861.

Federal court system 

Under the Judiciary Act of 1789 the federal court structure at the time comprised District Courts, which had general trial jurisdiction; Circuit Courts, which had mixed trial and appellate (from the US District Courts) jurisdiction; and the United States Supreme Court, which had appellate jurisdiction over the federal District and Circuit courts—and for certain issues over state courts. The Supreme Court also had limited original jurisdiction (i.e., in which cases could be filed directly with the Supreme Court without first having been heard by a lower federal or state court). There were one or more federal District Courts and/or Circuit Courts in each state, territory, or other geographical region.

The Judiciary Act of 1891 created the United States Courts of Appeals and reassigned the jurisdiction of most routine appeals from the district and circuit courts to these appellate courts. The Act created nine new courts that were originally known as the "United States Circuit Courts of Appeals." The new courts had jurisdiction over most appeals of lower court decisions. The Supreme Court could review either legal issues that a court of appeals certified or decisions of court of appeals by writ of certiorari. On January 1, 1912, the effective date of the Judicial Code of 1911, the old Circuit Courts were abolished, with their remaining trial court jurisdiction transferred to the U.S. District Courts.

List of cases in volume 307 U.S. 

[a] Douglas took no part in the case
[b] Frankfurter took no part in the case
[c] Reed took no part in the case
[d] Hughes took no part in the case
[e] Butler took no part in the case
[f] Stone took no part in the case
[g] McReynolds took no part in the case

Notes and references

External links 
  Case reports in volume 307 from Library of Congress
  Case reports in volume 307 from Court Listener
  Case reports in volume 307 from the Caselaw Access Project of Harvard Law School
  Case reports in volume 307 from Google Scholar
  Case reports in volume 307 from Justia
  Case reports in volume 307 from Open Jurist
 Website of the United States Supreme Court
 United States Courts website about the Supreme Court
 National Archives, Records of the Supreme Court of the United States
 American Bar Association, How Does the Supreme Court Work?
 The Supreme Court Historical Society